Berwick Manor and Orchard, is located on Boronda Road off Carmel Valley Road in Carmel Valley, California. The farmstead was acquired in 1869 by Edward Berwick, a prolific writer and educator as well as a scientific farmer. The manor and orchard was listed on the National Register of Historic Places on November 17, 1977.

History

 

The Berwick Manor and Orchard in Carmel Valley, California, was purchased by Edward Berwick for $500 in gold on September 23, 1869, which consisted of 120 acres near Robinson Canyon Road. It included a ranch house, garden, pool, and barns. He cultivated and sold walnuts, apples, vegetables, pears, and strawberries. Edward Berwick launched a successful orchard business, where he developed the Berwick Pear, a variety of the Winter Nelis pear, which became world famous for their quality. He shipped the pears each year to London and Paris.  Berwick built a reservoir system and windmill on the property to irrigate his orchard and garden.

The farm has been in continual ownership and operation by the Berwick family since 1869 and is the only intact farmstead of this period left in Carmel Valley.

The property has been held by four families, since its initial parceling in the Mexican land grant in present-day Monterey County, California, given on January 27, 1840, to Antonio Romero by Governor Juan Alvarado. It was used during the Great Depression by the federal government to teach local ranchers more scientific farming methods.

In 1881, the Berwicks built a house in Pacific Grove, California. Berwick traveled to Carmel Valley to take care and manage the orchard and garden.

Edward Berwick died on January 28, 1934, in Monterey, California. He was 91 years old. After his death, the Berwick Orchards were put for rent. An 89.82 acre parcel of land at the Berwick Manor and Orchard was sold in 1961 and later subdivided into what is known today as the Berwick Manor Subdivision.

See also
 National Register of Historic Places listings in Monterey County, California

References

External links

Farms on the National Register of Historic Places in California
National Register of Historic Places in Monterey County, California
Carmel Valley, California